Howard Swazey Buck (October 23, 1894 – August 15, 1947) was an American poet and critic.

Life
He graduated from Yale University in 1916, where he contributed light verse to campus humor magazine The Yale Record.

During World War I, he was in the American Expeditionary Forces.

Awards
 1919 Yale Series of Younger Poets Competition

Works
  
 A Study in Smollett: chiefly "Peregrine Pickle", Howard Swazey Buck, Philip Hamilton, Yale university press, 1925
 Smollett as poet, Yale University Press, 1927

References

External links

"The Authenticity of Smollett's Ode to Independence", by Luella F. Norwood, Oxford University Press. 1941

American male poets
United States Army personnel of World War I
Yale Younger Poets winners
Yale University alumni
1894 births
1947 deaths
20th-century American poets
20th-century American male writers